Asymmetrura is a genus of moths in the family Scythrididae.

Species
 Asymmetrura albilineata (Walsingham, 1888)
 Asymmetrura brevistrigella (Chambers, 1875)
 Asymmetrura graminivorella (Braun, 1920)
 Asymmetrura impositella (Zeller, 1855)
 Asymmetrura reducta (Braun, 1923)
 Asymmetrura scintillifera (Braun, 1927)

References

Scythrididae
Moth genera